Philonotis seriata is a species of moss belonging to the family Bartramiaceae. It is widely distributed in Europe but it is also found in other parts of the world.

In a study of the effect of the herbicide Asulam on moss growth, Philonotis seriata was shown to have intermediate sensitivity to Asulam exposure.

References

Bartramiaceae
Plants described in 1859